The 2020–21 Hawaii Rainbow Wahine basketball team represented the University of Hawaii at Manoa during the 2020–21 NCAA Division I women's basketball season. The Rainbow Wahine, led by ninth-year head coach Laura Beeman, will play their home games at the Stan Sheriff Center in Honolulu, Hawaii. Hawaii is a member of the Big West Conference, and participates in their 9th season in that conference.

Previous season 
The Rainbow Wahine finished the 2019–20 season 15–17 (10–6 in Big West play), to finish fourth in the Big West standings. They defeated Cal State Fullerton in the first round of the Big West Conference tournament, 72–59. They did not play any other games beyond that as the tournament was canceled due to the COVID-19 pandemic.

Departures

Incoming transfers

2020 Commitments

Roster

Schedule and results 

|-
!colspan=9 style=| Non-conference regular season

|-
!colspan=9 style=| Big West regular season

|-
!colspan=12 style=| Big West tournament
|-

|-

References 

Hawaii Rainbow Wahine basketball seasons
Hawaii
2020 in sports in Hawaii
2021 in sports in Hawaii